The Crookston Pirates was the final moniker of the minor league baseball teams based in Crookston, Minnesota. Crookston teams played exclusively as members of the Class D  level Northern League, fielding league teams from 1902 to 1905 and 1933 to 1941. The Crookston Pirates were a minor league affiliate of the Chicago White Sox in 1936, St. Louis Cardinals in 1937 and Boston Red Sox in 1938. Crookston teams hosted home Northern League games at Crookston Field (1902–1905) and Highland Park (1933–1941).

Today, the Crookston "Pirates" moniker is used by Crookston High School, established in 1914.

History
Crookston was a charter member of the Class D level Northern League in 1902, playing as the Crookston Crooks before disbanding after the 1905 season.

Beginning in 1933, the Crookston Pirates played in the Northern League from 1933 to 1941 and were affiliates of the Chicago White Sox in 1936, St. Louis Cardinals in 1937 and Boston Red Sox in 1938.

The Crookston teams did not win a championship in their duration of play, but did qualify for the 1937 and 1938 Northern League playoffs.

Crookston High School in Crookston, Minnesota was founded in 1914 and still uses the "Pirates" moniker.

The ballparks
The early Crookston Crooks played minor league home games at Crookston Field from 1902 to 1905.

From 1933 to 1941, the Crookston Pirates hosted home games at Highland Park. With dimensions of 340–420–329, Highland Park had a capacity of 2,000 (1938). Today, the park is still in existence, as the Highland Park Complex sits on 40 acres, located at North Central Avenue and Barrette Street, Crookston, Minnesota.

Timeline

Year-by-Year Record

Notable alumni

Sheldon "Chief" Bender (1939–1940)
Lute Boone (1933-1935, MGR)
Bill Burwell (1938, MGR)
Bill Butland (1938)
Walter Carlisle (1902–1904)
Oscar Georgy (1937)
Jack Hallett (1935)
Joe Hatten (1939)
Jesse Hoffmeister (1903–1904)
Elmer Johnson (1934–1936, 1939–1940)
Dan Lally 1904)
Ham Patterson (1904)
Ken Penner (1936, MGR)
Les Rock (1934-1935)
Ernie Rudolph (1937)
Phil Todt (1939, MGR)
Julie Wera (1937)
Wes Westrum (1940) 2x MLB All–Star
Rollie Zeider (1905)

See also
Crookston Crooks playersCrookston Pirates players

References

External links
Baseball Reference

Northern League (1902-71) baseball teams
Defunct minor league baseball teams
Chicago White Sox minor league affiliates
St. Louis Cardinals minor league affiliates
Boston Red Sox minor league affiliates
Professional baseball teams in Minnesota
Crookston, Minnesota
Crookston Pirates players
1902 establishments in Minnesota
1941 disestablishments in Minnesota
Baseball teams established in 1902
Baseball teams disestablished in 1941
Defunct baseball teams in Minnesota
Greater Grand Forks